Daniil Karpyuk (born January 1, 1988) is a Russian former professional ice hockey forward.

Karpyuk played for HC Sibir Novosibirsk in the Russian Superleague and the Kontinental Hockey League. He also played two seasons in the Kazakhstan Hockey Championship for Arlan Kokshetau.

References

External links

1988 births
Living people
Sportspeople from Novosibirsk
Russian ice hockey forwards
HC Sibir Novosibirsk players
Sibirskie Snaipery players